Saint Benjamin   may refer to:

 Hieromartyr Benjamin of Petrograd (1873–1922), Metropolitan martyred by the Soviets
 Venerable Benjamin of the Kiev Caves (14th century), a Russian monk
 Saint Benjamin the Deacon and Martyr (329–424), martyred by the Persian King Varanes V
 Martyr Benjamin slain at Sinai and Raithu (d. 296), martyred during the reign of Diocletian
 Patriarch Benjamin, in the Old Testament, the last-born of Jacob's twelve sons